Alexia Putellas Segura (Catalan: Alèxia Putellas i Segura, ; born 4 February 1994) is a Spanish professional footballer who plays as a midfielder for Barcelona, which she captains, and the Spain national team. She previously played for Espanyol and Levante, and has represented Catalonia. Having won all major club and individual awards available to a European player by 2022, she is widely regarded as the best contemporary female footballer in the world, and one of the greatest of all time.

Putellas has played for Barcelona since 2012, after spending most of her youth career in the ranks of Espanyol. With Barcelona, she has won six league titles, seven Copas de la Reina, and one UEFA Women's Champions League title. In Barcelona's 2020–21 season, she played an essential role as her team won the Champions League as well as the resulting continental treble, both for the first time in their history. Putellas then went on to win the UEFA Women's Player of the Year Award, the Ballon d'Or Féminin, and The Best FIFA Women's Player in 2021, becoming the first player to win all three in the same year. In 2022, despite missing the UEFA Women's Euro 2022 due to injury, she won all three awards again, becoming the first woman to win any of them in consecutive years.

On the international stage, Putellas had success with Spain's youth national teams, winning two UEFA Women's U-17 Euros (in 2010 and 2011) as well as finishing second place in the 2012 UEFA Women's U-19 Euro. She made her debut for Spain's senior national team in 2013, and has since featured in three major international competitions with the team: Spain's FIFA Women's World Cup debut in 2015, the 2017 UEFA Women's Euro, and the 2019 World Cup.

As of 2022, Putellas has the second-most all-time appearances for Barcelona behind former left back Melanie Serrano, and is currently their second-highest all-time scorer behind former striker Jennifer Hermoso. She also holds the record of most appearances for Spain with 100 caps, having surpassed Marta Torrejón's previous record of 90 caps in 2021.

Early life and education
Alexia Putellas Segura was born on 4 February 1994, to Jaume Putellas Rota and Elisabet "Eli" Segura Sabaté in Mollet del Vallès, a municipality in the province of Barcelona. She has a younger sister, Alba. Putellas has been a supporter of FC Barcelona since her early childhood and would travel with the Penya of Mollet del Vallès to watch matches at the Camp Nou with her father. She would also watch Barcelona matches at a local bar, La Bolera, with her family; she has said that her family have always been fanatic supporters of the club, with the exception of a cousin who supports Real Madrid. In her youth, Putellas idolised male footballers Andrés Iniesta, Rivaldo, and Ronaldinho, who all played for Barcelona, as well as female footballer Louisa Nécib, who played for Olympique Lyonnais. Iniesta has returned the idolatry, calling Putellas a role model and saying she encapsulates the values of FC Barcelona.

Born into a basketball-playing family, Putellas played basketball as well as hockey and tennis as a child. She began playing football at school, and attended football camps run by Xavi for two summers, before joining a club in 2001 at seven years old. Her mother allowed her to join a football team on the condition she stop playing at school, though she continued. Putellas interpreted her mother's request as a reflection of machismo, specifically prejudice towards girls playing football, in society, saying that her family themselves always accepted her ambitions. A mature and reserved but not shy child, Putellas showed leadership qualities from a young age. She enjoyed football at school, where she was either the one choosing football teams or got picked first, but knows women who felt sidelined by peers for wanting to participate and has said she did not think she could have a football career due to being female. Putellas' first club was the local CF Mollet UE boys' team; she only had three training sessions there, leaving as she did not like the atmosphere and soon after joining the Sabadell girls' team.

In 2013, Putellas began studying Business Administration and Management at the Pompeu Fabra University in Barcelona, later taking a break from her studies to focus on football. She had chosen to study for a degree due to a lack of professionalism in Spanish women's football.

Club career

Sabadell, youth 
When she was seven, Putellas began playing for Sabadell, being enrolled through a family friend who played for the club. She first played with Vicky Losada and Marta Corredera at Sabadell. The team would not accept players younger than eight, with Putellas' family initially lying about her age so she would be accepted. Despite being several years younger than some of her teammates, Putellas was made one of the team captains. Sabadell was the only nearby club that had a women's section and, though the women's team flourished during the period Putellas was with them, the girls' team was not a priority. It was difficult for Putellas and her family to manage her training there as a child. She gave an interview in 2004, aged 10, admitting that when she had been very young she did not always like football; by this age, she was playing it religiously.

Barcelona La Masia, 2005–06 
In 2005, Putellas spent a year in La Masia, Barcelona's youth academy. Joining Barcelona was her dream, but she had to leave when the women's system was restructured and there was no team for her age group; Xavi Llorens, who became manager in 2006, reflected that he always expected Putellas to return, "it was just a matter of waiting for the right time". Many of the displaced players joined the other Barcelona team, Espanyol, which Putellas did when she was twelve.

Espanyol

Youth, 2006–10
She joined the Espanyol girls' team when she was twelve.

Senior, 2010–11
Putellas made her senior team debut with Espanyol when she was sixteen years old. She was a part of the Espanyol squad that won the 2010 Copa de la Reina in a 3–1 win vs Rayo Vallecano.

In 2011, she started in the final of the Copa de la Reina for Espanyol, where they lost 0–1 in extra time against Barcelona. Putellas' performances with Espanyol identified her as one of Spain's best young players.

Levante, 2011–12 
Already a star in the fledgling women's football world in Spain after her success with the youth national team, Putellas attracted attention when she moved to Valencian club Levante at the age of seventeen, only a month after the 2011 Copa de la Reina final. Levante did not compete in the 2012 Copa de la Reina due to failing to qualify in the previous season, but had numerous Spain football veterans and a professional environment, unusual at the time, which is said to have contributed to Putellas' individual growth. Individually, she had a successful 2011–2012 campaign, scoring 15 goals in 34 matches (playing all matches in the season) and finishing as Levante's top scorer. At Levante, she was coached in how to play off the ball, developing technical and tactical skills like a midfielder, and to become capable with both feet after the coach, Antonio Contreras, felt she was too reliant on her left. He also described her as a very classy and intelligent player already.

Barcelona

2012–13

Llorens and Barcelona had continued to follow Putellas' career after she left La Masia and in the summer of 2012, following her breakthrough year with Levante and the death of her father, approached her to rejoin the club. She accepted the offer, and started and played most of Barcelona's matches that season. Because of Barcelona's first-ever league title win in the previous season, they were set to make their debut in the 2012–13 UEFA Women's Champions League. On 26 September 2013, Putellas started in her UEFA Women's Champions League debut against Arsenal, where they lost 0–3 at home. In the away leg, Barcelona lost 0–4, and exited their tournament debut in the Round of 32.

On 4 May 2013, Putellas won her first league title with the club when Barcelona won 2–1 against Athletic Bilbao. The match, played at the San Mamés with 25,000 spectators, is remembered by Putellas as one of her favorite matches of her career because it "made her feel like a footballer." In the 2013 final of the Copa de la Reina, she scored Barcelona's third goal versus Prainsa Zaragoza, where she dribbled past two Zaragoza defenders, past their keeper, and poked the ball into the net. The goal went viral and attracted more attention for Putellas from Spanish and international media. Barcelona won 4–0, the first domestic double in their history. Putellas, playing as a forward, was chosen as MVP of the Copa de la Reina final for her performance.

2013–14
Putellas won her second consecutive league title with Barcelona after the team went unbeaten throughout 27 rounds. Putellas was also an integral part of Barcelona's 2014 Copa de la Reina campaign, scoring in each round of the knockout stage. Barcelona advanced past the quarterfinals against Real Sociedad with an aggregate score of 1–0, a Putellas goal in the away leg being the tie decider. In the home leg of the semifinals, she scored in a 2–1 Barcelona home win versus Rayo Vallecano. That tie would end up finishing 3–1, propelling the team to the final against Athletic Bilbao. Putellas scoring an outside-the-box goal in extra time of the final meant a penalty shootout for Barcelona, where she scored the game-winning fifth penalty and earned her fifth major club trophy. She was named MVP of the Copa de la Reina for the second season in a row.

2014–15
Putellas scored her first ever Champions League goal in the Round of 32 of the 2014–15 UEFA Women's Champions League against Czech side Slavia Prague. Barcelona advanced after defeating Slavia Prague on a 4-0 aggregate score, but failed to get past Bristol City, losing 1–2 on aggregate in the Round of 16.

Putellas won her third league title with the club after Barcelona were crowned champions in April 2015.

2015–16

Putellas missed Barcelona's first UEFA Women's Champions League match of the 2015–16 season against BIIK Kazygurt, which ended in a 1–1 draw. She returned the following match, assisting Jennifer Hermoso against the Kazakh side in a 4–0 win. She scored the first four-goal game of her career in 2015, in a 10–0 win against Fundación Albacete.

In the quarterfinals of the 2016 Copa de la Reina, Putellas scored a brace and gave an assist to Míriam Diéguez in a 5–1 win against Real Sociedad, sending the blaugranas to the semifinal. She finished her season as Barcelona's second-highest goalscorer in the league with 18 goals.

2016–17
In February 2017, Putellas was named as a candidate for the FIFPro Women's World XI for the first time, where she was listed amongst the forwards. In the 2016–2017 season, Barcelona reached the semi-finals of the UEFA Women's Champions League for the first time in the club's history. They were knocked out 5–1 on aggregate by Paris Saint Germain, where Putellas started both matches. On 18 June 2017, Putellas won her third Copa de la Reina with the club when she scored in the 2017 Copa de la Reina final in a 4–1 win against Atlético Madrid.

2017–18
On 2 October 2017, Putellas wore the captain's band for the first time at Barcelona in a match against Santa Teresa, after all four of the club's captains were either benched or not selected in that matchday squad.

Putellas was Barcelona's sole scorer in both legs of the 2018 Copa de la Reina quarterfinal, scoring both match-winners against Levante to bring Barcelona to the semifinals. After advancing past Athletic Bilbao in the semifinals, Barcelona made it to the final where they won 1–0 over Atlético Madrid late in extra time.

2018–19

In the 2018–2019 season, Putellas was named as Barcelona's fourth captain, the first official captaincy role of her senior career. In the first match of that season's Champions League, Putellas conceded an own goal as Barcelona fell in a 3–1 shock defeat to BIIK Kazygurt. They came back from that loss to win 3–0 at home, and ended up advancing to the semifinals for the second time in club history. Putellas started both games versus Bayern, where Barcelona won 2–0 on aggregate. On 18 May 2019, Putellas started in Barcelona's first ever UWCL final versus Lyon, who went on to win the match 4–1. Following Barcelona's loss in the final, Putellas was named to the UEFA Women's Champions League Squad of the Season for the first time in her career. Not soon after, she renewed her contract with the club for 3 more seasons to 2022. She ended the season as Barcelona's top scorer in the league with 16 goals and overall with 18 goals.

2019–20
In 2019, Putellas was given second captaincy for the first time at Barcelona after being named as fourth captain in the previous year. For the first few months of the 2019–20 season, she captained the side during Vicky Losada's hamstring injury, but began to start as captain in most matches by default as Losada transitioned to an off-the-bench role. On 7 September 2019, she became the first player to ever score at the Estadi Johan Cruyff in a 9–1 win versus Tacón, the team that would later become Real Madrid. Some days later, Putellas scored Barcelona's first goal of the 2019-20 Champions League campaign, away against Juventus. In the home leg, she scored the first ever Champions League goal at the Estadi Johan Cruyff.

In February of the following year, she started and captained both legs of the first ever Supercopa de España Femenina. In the final, she scored a brace in a 10–1 thrashing of Real Sociedad, winning her first major title with the club in two years. Later in the month, she made her 300th appearance for Barcelona against Sporting Huelva, the fourth player in Barcelona's history to reach that many appearances after Melanie Serrano, Marta Unzué, and Vicky Losada. She was honored at Estadi Johan Cruyff for the milestone in March. Following the beginning of the COVID-19 pandemic in Europe, the 2019-20 league season was suspended, with Barcelona being crowned the winner with 21 out of 32 matchdays played. It was Putellas’ first league title since 2015, and her fourth with the club overall. She ended up contributing 10 goals and 8 assists in 20 league matches. At the end of the season, Putellas was named the best player of the 2019–20 league campaign.

Upon the resumption of the 2019–20 UEFA Women's Champions League, Barcelona played Atlético Madrid in the single-legged quarterfinal, where they won 1–0. Barcelona advanced to the semifinal of the competition, where they were knocked out 1–0 by VfL Wolfsburg. In a post-match interview, when asked about the gap in quality between Barcelona and other elite European teams, Putellas claimed "there is no distance." On the continental stage, Putellas was named as a candidate for the UEFA Women's Team of the Year for 2020.

Although the 2019–20 UEFA Women's Champions League was completed, Barcelona were still due to complete the remaining matches of that season's Copa de la Reina campaign. Owing to the COVID-19 pandemic, the semifinals and final of the 2019–20 Copa de la Reina were pushed back to be played during the 2020–21 season. On 13 February 2021, Putellas played the 2020 Copa de la Reina final against Logroño, and drew a penalty which she scored to put Barcelona 1–0 up. Barcelona won the final 3–0, Putellas' fifth Copa de la Reina title with the club.

2020–21
As first captain Vicky Losada continued to be utilized mainly as a substitute at Barcelona, Putellas started matches as captain throughout most of the 2020–21 season. In the first match of the league season, Putellas started the first ever women's El Clásico against Real Madrid, where she scored the fourth and final goal of the match. On 6 January 2021, Putellas captained Barcelona against Espanyol, the first time women's teams ever played a competitive match at the Camp Nou. Just before halftime, Putellas scored a header goal off a corner kick from Caroline Graham Hansen, becoming the first female player to score a competitive goal at the stadium. The following week, she played against Atlético Madrid in the semifinal of the 2021 Supercopa de España Femenina, where she scored a free-kick in the 90th minute to tie the match and take it to extra time. Barcelona lost the match on penalties, one of their three losses that season in all competitions. In the second edition of the women's El Clásico, Putellas scored Barcelona's first ever home goal against Los Blancos. That goal was also her 100th goal scored in the league with Barcelona.

In the 2020–21 Champions League, Barcelona advanced to their second ever final. A day prior to the Champions League final, Putellas trained separately from the group with her left thigh heavily bandaged due to strain on her hamstring, and was at risk of not starting the final with the status of "doubtful." Putellas said that when the pain continued in training, she focused on her mentality instead, making herself believe she was not injured so that she could play on top form. On 16 May 2021, despite her injury, Putellas started the second Champions League final of her career, this time against Chelsea. After going 1–0 up within 30 seconds, Barcelona were awarded a penalty after Melanie Leupolz made contact with Jenni Hermoso in the box. Putellas scored the penalty to put Barcelona 2–0 up within 13 minutes. In the 20th minute of the match, Putellas sent a through ball into the box towards Aitana Bonmatí, who scored Barcelona's third. The goal was later selected as the fifth-best goal of the competition. Barcelona ended the match winning 4–0, the largest margin of victory in any single-legged UWCL final, and Putellas was selected to that year's UWCL Squad of the Season. Later in the year, she was listed as a nominee to the UEFA Women's Champions League Midfielder of the Season award, which she won in August.

Later in the month of May, she competed in the final stages of the 2020–21 Copa de la Reina. Putellas was sidelined for the two league matches between the Champions League Final and the semifinal of the Copa de la Reina due to her previous injury, but started the semifinal against Madrid CFF where she scored two goals in a 4–0 win. Her two goals made her the first player in Barcelona's history to exceed 10 goals in the Copa de la Reina. In the final, played on 30 May 2021, Putellas scored two goals against Levante – a header from a Lieke Martens corner service and another coming from a shot from open play into the far right corner. The match ended with a 4–2 victory to Barcelona as they completed the continental treble, a first for a Spanish women's club team. Putellas also won MVP of the Copa de la Reina Final for the third time in her career, and scored the most goals in the tournament with five. The cup was her sixth Copa de la Reina with Barcelona and her seventh overall. Putellas ended her season as the highest-scoring midfielder in Europe with 26 goals in all competitions.

2021–22
Following the departure of captain Vicky Losada, Putellas overtook first-captain duties at the beginning of the 2021–22 season. In August 2021, she was nominated as a UEFA Women's Player of the Year Finalist alongside Barcelona teammates Lieke Martens and Jennifer Hermoso. Putellas was given the award later in the month, becoming the first Spanish woman to win it. In September 2021, Putellas renewed her Barcelona contract for three more years until 2024. On 25 September, she scored one of the fastest-ever hat-tricks in her club's history after she netted three goals in four minutes in her side's 8–0 thrashing of Valencia, one of which was scored from 40-yards. In the month of October, Putellas kicked off Barcelona's 2021–22 UEFA Women's Champions League campaign by scoring their second goal in a 4-1 group stage win against Arsenal. That same month, she was listed as a nominee for the 2021 Ballon d'Or Féminin, the first Ballon d'Or nomination of her career. In November, Putellas scored 3 goals in two Champions League group stage matches against Hoffenheim. She finished the 2021-22 UWCL group stage with 5 goals.

On 29 November 2021, Putellas was awarded the 2021 Ballon d'Or Féminin. She became the first Spanish woman to win any World Player of the Year/Ballon d'Or award, and was the first Spaniard since Luis Suárez in 1960 to win a Ballon d'Or. She dedicated the award to her father and thanked her teammates. In January of the following year, Putellas was named as the winner of FIFA's The Best Womens Player Award, the second FC Barcelona Femení player to win the award after Lieke Martens in 2017. Days later, Putellas scored a 91st-minute winner in a 1-0 match against Real Madrid in the semifinals of the 2021–22 Supercopa Femenina. She later started and played 65 minutes of the Supercopa Femenina final, which ended 7-0 in Barcelona's favor against Atlético Madrid.

Putellas began Barcelona's 2021–22 Copa de la Reina campaign by scoring a goal in a 3-1 win against Rayo Vallecano in the Round of 16 of the tournament. In the quarterfinal of the tournament, played on 16 March 2022, Putellas scored 2 goals in a 3-0 win against Real Sociedad to advance Barcelona to the semifinals. Later that month, Putellas competed in Barcelona's UWCL quarterfinal matches against domestic rivals Real Madrid. In the first leg, she scored 2 goals to help Barcelona to a narrow 3-1 away win. In the following home leg, Putellas started and scored Barcelona's 4th goal in a 5-2 win over Real Madrid at the Camp Nou. The match broke the record for attendance at a women's football match with 91,553 fans in attendance. In April 2022, Putellas started and scored two goals in a 5-1 UWCL semifinal win over VfL Wolfsburg. The match, again hosted at the Camp Nou, broke the women's football world attendance record once more with 91,648 people in attendance.

On 21 May 2022, Putellas started Barcelona's second-consecutive UEFA Women's Champions League Final against Olympique Lyon. She played all 90 minutes and scored Barcelona's only goal in a 1-3 loss. At the conclusion of the tournament, she was named the 2021-22 UWCL Player of the Season, included in the 2021–22 UWCL Team of the Season, and was recognized as the 2021–22 UWCL Top Scorer, scoring 11 goals throughout the competition. She also had the most direct goal involvements of any player in the competition with a combined 13 goals and assists.

Putellas returned to domestic competition on the 25th of May in Barcelona's semi-final Copa de la Reina clash against Real Madrid. She assisted Lieke Martens' opening goal in a match that ended as a 4-0 win. In Barcelona's final match of the season- the Copa de la Reina final against Sporting Huelva- Putellas played the entire match of a 6-1 win and scored Barcelona's sixth and final goal. Putellas finished as the joint-top scorer of the 2021–22 Copa de la Reina, tied with Anita Marcos and Alicia Martínez with 4 goals.

By the end of the season, Putellas' teammates agreed that "Barcelona is Alexia and Alexia is Barcelona". She finished her league season with 18 goals and a league-best 15 assists as Barcelona had a perfect, wins-only season. Her 2021-22 season was also the first time in her career that she had scored over 30 goals in a single season, and the first season since 2018-19 that she was Barcelona's top scorer in all competitions. Like last season, Putellas finished as Europe's highest-scoring midfielder with 34 goals in all competitions.

2022–23 
On 5 July 2022, Putellas suffered an ACL injury while training with the Spain national team before the 2022 UEFA Women's Euro. Her recovery period post-surgery was estimated to be between 10 and 12 months, meaning she would miss most of, if not the entire 2022–23 Primera División season and 2022–23 UEFA Women's Champions League season. Throughout the season, she instead picked up awards for the previous year: by the end of February 2023 she had retained all three of her UEFA Women's Player of the Year, Ballon d'Or Féminin and FIFA The Best Women's Player awards, creating a new record for consecutive wins.

At the start of February 2023, Putellas had begun more intensive training with Barcelona again.

International career

Youth

Catalonia 
Putellas was involved in the autonomous Catalan youth teams from the age of ten. She was champion of Spain with the Catalan under-14, under-15, and under-16 national teams.

Spain 
Putellas began playing for Spanish youth national teams at fifteen. She took part in the UEFA U-17 Women's Championship with Spain in 2010, her first major international championship with a Spanish national team. Spain ended up finishing on top of the group, with three wins from three matches, and went on to sweep all their remaining matches, winning the final against Ireland on penalties. This was Spain's first ever title at the women's U-17 level, and its first at the youth level since 2004.

Spain's win at the 2010 UEFA U-17 Women's Championship gave them qualification for the FIFA U-17 Women's World Cup, played in the same year. Putellas scored in Spain's first match of the competition, as they won 4–1 against Japan. Spain finished first in the group stages, and went on to face Brazil in the quarterfinals, where Putellas assisted both of Spain's goals in a 2–1 win. When Spain reached the semifinal against South Korea, Putellas assisted Amanda Sampedro's match-opening goal, but Spain eventually lost 2–1. Spain won against North Korea in the third-place playoff match. Spain went on to replicate their success in 2011. In the first match of the final round, Putellas scored twice against Iceland in a 4-0 win, sending Spain to the final. Spain won 1–0 against France in the final, Putellas' second UEFA Women's Under-17 Championship win.

The following year, Putellas carried on experiencing success with Spain's U-19 team. She competed in the 2012 UEFA Women's Under-19 Championship, playing as an attacker and captaining the Spanish team. She said that she did not find captaining to weigh on her, but the opposite, that it gave her a boost in tough moments. Putellas scored in Spain's second match of the group stage in a 4–0 win against England. After finishing on top of their group, Spain played in the semifinal against Portugal, where Putellas assisted Raquel Pinel's game-winning goal. Spain advanced to the final, where Putellas started and captained the match but was taken off in the 83rd minute as Spain were defeated by Sweden in the second period of overtime. Though the tournament took place less than a month after Putellas' father died, she has said she had no hesitation deciding to go, saying that football was both her escape and her connection to him.

The 2012 UEFA Women's U-19 Championship would be Putellas' last for Spain's youth national teams. In the second round of qualifying for the 2013 UEFA Women's Under-19 Championship, Spain were placed in a group with Germany, the Czech Republic and Greece. She captained Spain in the group, scoring twice in three matches, but they finished third in the qualification table with one win and two losses, failing to progress. Despite the high-ranking opposition, Putellas had gone into the group confident, comparing her side's gameplay to that of the Spain men's senior team and saying they would "defend the shirt to the death". With Putellas and nearly two-thirds of the under-19 team aging out of the bracket in 2013 and 2014, and having not qualified for any major tournament for those years, it was said to be the end of an era for what was seen as a dominant period for Spain's youth women's teams.

Senior

Spain 
Putellas earned her first cap for the Spain senior national team in a 2–2 pre-tournament friendly draw with Denmark in Vejle in June 2013. The following day, national team coach Ignacio Quereda confirmed her as a member of his 23-player squad for the 2013 European Championship finals in Sweden. She and friend Virginia Torrecilla were called up as part of Quereda's plan to add the "freshness" of youth players in with senior figures. Reflecting on the differences between men's and women's football in Spain shortly after being called up, Putellas said that stereotypes in society prevented the Spain women's team from seeing the same success as the men's, despite having the same technical quality. In Spain's first match of the 2013 Euro, Putellas made her competitive match debut when she was subbed on against England. She scored the winner at the end of added time in Spain's 3–2 victory with a header, her first senior international goal. The win was Spain's first win at a Euro tournament in 16 years, their first win against England in 17 years, as well as their only win of that tournament. Putellas was a substitute again in the team's next match against France. She then started in the group match against Russia, and as Spain were eliminated by Norway in the quarter-final.

In May 2015, Putellas was called up as part of Spain's squad at the 2015 FIFA Women's World Cup in Canada, their first ever participation in a World Cup. She started every game in the tournament, where Spain put up an uninspiring display of two losses and a draw. Her and her 22 teammates in the squad called for the resignation of long-tenured coach Ignacio Quereda, citing poor preparation for the tournament and lost confidence.

Under Putellas' former coach with Spain's U-17s, Jorge Vilda, she was called up to Spain's 2017 UEFA Women's Euro squad. She started in each of Spain's group stage games at the UEFA Women's Euro 2017, where they advanced to the knockouts on a head-to-head tiebreaker with a record of one win and two losses. Spain was defeated by Austria on penalties, where she was subbed in at the 68th minute.

In May 2019, Putellas was named part of Spain's squad at the 2019 FIFA Women's World Cup, both her and Spain's second Women's World Cup tournament. She played in each of Spain's three group stage games where they advanced to the Round of 16, making it Spain's most successful run in a World Cup. Spain put up an impressive display against the United States, the eventual tournament winners. Putellas started that match, which ended up a 1–2 loss to the United States.

Nine months after the World Cup, Spain competed in the 2020 SheBelieves Cup, against Japan, England, and Round of 16 World Cup opponents the United States. Putellas scored once against Japan and scored a late match-winner with a header against England. Her performances earned her player of the tournament.

In 2020, after Spain teammate and close friend Virginia Torrecilla was diagnosed with cancer, Putellas began wearing Torrecillas's number 14 with the Spain national team. Putellas said she would not retire the number until Torrecilla returns to the national team. In 2021, Putellas was named of the three captains of the Spanish national team, with Irene Paredes and Jennifer Hermoso.

On 26 October 2021, Putellas surpassed Marta Torrejón's record for Spain national team appearances, picking up her 91st cap in a 2023 FIFA Women's World Cup qualifying match against Ukraine. On 2 November 2021, she was named the Spain women's national team Player of the Year.

On 1 July 2022, she became the first player to reach 100 caps with the national team, achieving this in a friendly match against Italy. Days later she was included in Jorge Vilda's final list to represent Spain at the 2022 UEFA Women's Euro but, on 5 July, the day before the Euro began, suffered an ACL tear of her left leg, which caused her to miss the entire tournament and potentially the entire 2022–23 season. She attended Spain's debut match at the Euros from the stands, a 4–1 victory against Finland, before returning to Barcelona and having a knee operation on 12 July 2022.

In September of 2022, Putellas gave her public support to 15 of her Spain teammates who refused to play for the national team until the RFEF addressed their concerns about their poor mental and physical health while playing under head coach Jorge Vilda. On 23 September, she and the 15 players posted a joint statement that criticized the RFEF for their response to the situation.

Style of play

Having been a left-sided forward winger with playmaking ability in her youth career, the predominantly left-footed Putellas is best known as a left-sided 'number 8' central or attacking midfielder for both Barcelona and Spain. For Spain, she has also been played as a lone 'number 10'. She has been described as the perfect "Barcelona midfielder", with the vision, passing ability, and passing accuracy that resembles her male counterparts of Barcelona's successful Guardiola era; her technique has been compared to that of male Barcelona footballers Xavi, Sergio Busquets, and particularly Andrés Iniesta, all of whom she has said inspire her game, as well as Real Madrid's Luka Modrić. GOAL has described her as "technically superb", creative, and decisive. Alongside her technical ability, she is hailed for her leadership capabilities and overall fitness.

Normally situated in the central midfield of the set-up, Putellas is one of the main contributors to Barcelona's attack, with the ability to play as an attacking midfielder and a second striker. Putellas regularly finishes each season as one of Barcelona's top contributors in terms of both goals and assists. In the 2018–19 season she was the club's highest scorer in all competitions, and in the 2020–21 and 2021–22 seasons, she was Europe's highest-scoring midfielder. Her statistics around attacking play reflect those of a centre forward, and she is most typically positioned in the opposition half as the furthest-forward midfielder, occupying a "half-space" between the opposition's back lines, and between their full-back and centre-back; her ability to receive with either foot helps her to keep the ball in this tight space, opening up attacking routes forward. In attack, she is often the player to receive the ball from deep as the final stage of build-up play, quickly pressing or passing forward. When the attack is less advanced, Putellas is able to move further back and become a passing option for her backlines when they are looking for options to break through and attack; when positioned further back, she does not act as a deep-lying playmaker, with her creative play instead occurring in the final third.

With the ball played down the left, Putellas often provides assists, using her skills on the ball to create goal-scoring opportunities in the final third. Her creative play is described by Give Me Sport as regularly "terrorising players with her fancy flicks and deft body feints". The website also noted her exceptional passing ability; though typically playing shorter passes, and more unsuccessful than not at playing through balls, Putellas otherwise has good statistics for pass accuracy and pass importance, and is often successful at passing into the penalty area. Not known for her speed, her ball management skills still allow her to dribble and keep possession, successfully dribbling an above-average amount.

When the ball is played down the right, Putellas will position herself in the box, often at the back post, taking advantage of her relative height as an option to score. As a midfielder, she sometimes takes shots from outside the area, though these are less accurate than her shots inside the box, of which she takes many; her ability to find space in the box poses a significant attacking threat. When making forward runs instead of creating the attack, Putellas will come from behind her team's forward line and so is harder for the opposition defence to detect, allowing her to identify precise routes through and time her runs to receive a ball. In this play, she is also difficult to conventionally mark due to roaming.

When needed, she can find herself in defensive midfield and left-back positions to help Barcelona open up spaces and retain possession. Spain presses high, with Putellas able to contribute to defensive play high up the pitch. In both teams, Putellas' defensive play is typically blocking the opposition's deepest midfielder, winning over 60% of defensive duels, though she has a frequent tendency to foul players she tries to recover balls from. She makes a significant number of loose ball recoveries in the opposition half and has a good work rate when counter-pressing.

In popular culture
Putellas is sponsored by Nike. In 2019, she scored the longest-range goal at the Camp Nou (100m) in a promotional event for Nike's new PhantomVNM Boots. After reaching the 2019 Women's Champions League Final, she was the face of Nike's promotions for FC Barcelona, with a billboard displayed in the streets of Barcelona that read "don't play for finals, play for history." After her 2021 Ballon d'Or win, Nike gifted her a custom gold crown and a pair of custom-made gold Phantom GT 2 boots. They gave her another custom pair of the same boots after her 2022 Ballon d'Or win, branded as Phantom GT II; the "ll" digraph in her surname was stylised as "" on the box to indicate her second win, with the heel also featuring "Alexia II". Putellas has additional sponsorships with Cupra, Allianz and Visa, and is a member of Team VISA. She is also an ambassador of fashion brand Mango, with the partnership focusing on promoting equality.

In 2022, Putellas was given an overall rating of 92 in the football simulation video game FIFA 23, the highest rating in the game for any player, including men. She has been dubbed "La Reina" (The Queen) by fans, the media, and by Nike, who included the nickname in a congratulatory post for her 2021 Ballon d'Or win. In a 2022 docu-series about Putellas, Alexia: Labor Omnia Vincit, teammate Mapi León said that she had earned such a sobriquet. Discussing this series, women's football reporter Asif Burhan wrote that Putellas' "dedication to the sport has revolutionized the women's game."

Putellas is one of three footballers to be awarded the Creu de Sant Jordi, one of the highest civilian orders in Catalonia, with Lionel Messi and Johan Cruyff. She also received the Gold Medal for Sporting Merit. In 2021, her hometown, the municipality of Mollet, announced plans to award Putellas the civic title (akin to Freedom of the City) "Per Mollet"; in 2011 they had honoured her with the International Sports Award.

A mural depicting Putellas as Superwoman, over the slogan "follow your dreams" and a lilac background to represent feminism, was painted by Italian neo-pop artist TVBoy in the neighbourhood of Gràcia in Barcelona, a place of iconic street art and architecture, debuting on Father's Day in March 2022. TVBoy said that his young daughter telling him she was inspired to be a footballer was one reason for the mural, so that it can inspire more girls. The location previously featured a different TVBoy mural, of Argentine footballer Diego Maradona. The mural of Putellas has received many visits but, despite the popularity of Putellas and the mural in Barcelona, has been vandalised. In June 2022, TVBoy shared that he was fixing it personally with the message "haters, we never surrender". It was then defaced with graffiti of lesbophobic slurs and misogynistic comments in January 2023, being restored by TVBoy again in February.

At the Globe Soccer Awards in Dubai in 2021, an image of Putellas – named Women's Player of the Year at the ceremony – was displayed on the Burj Khalifa, the first time a woman's image has been displayed on the building. In 2022, artwork of Putellas (combining her head and a golden ball) was included in the "Fútbol. Arte. Iconos. En ese orden." exhibit of famous footballers at the Casa Seat in Barcelona; later that year, a wax figure of Putellas was added to the Barcelona wax museum. Both of Putellas' Ballons d'Or are on display in the FC Barcelona Museum.

The first song on Brazilian band Skank's 2014 album  is a tribute to Putellas. Titled "Alexia", it was inspired by her viral goal in the 2013 Copa de la Reina final and compares her to global icons Jimi Hendrix, Elvis Presley, and Messi, and Catalan icons Antoni Gaudí and Joan Miró, as well as commenting on her physical beauty and her style of play. The band visited Putellas in Barcelona to play her the song and seek her approval before releasing it. The gymnasium at her former school is named for her. After winning the Ballon d'Or in 2021, her hometown of Mollet announced plans to rename their football pitch after her; she turned this down after initially accepting, saying that she wanted the pitch to continue honouring the Gonzalvo brothers (Juli, Josep, and Marià, after whom it was originally named), fellow Barcelona footballers from Mollet. For International Women's Day 2023, the viewpoint (mirador) overlooking historic Romanesque monuments in Sant Joan les Fonts was named for Putellas.

In 2019, Putellas spoke out against prison sentences for Catalan independence leaders in the aftermath of the 2017 Catalan independence referendum, saying the sentences were "not the solution." She was part of the Madrid Pride parade for Madrid lesbian bar Fulanita de Tal in 2019, with Jennifer Hermoso. For Holy Week 2022, Easter monas depicting Putellas in some way were the most popular design of mona in Catalonia, overtaking Messi designs.

Putellas is the author of a pseudo-autobiographical children's book series, Alexia Superfutbolista, with three books as of 2022. She has been featured in various series documenting female footballers, including the 2021 Rakuten TV miniseries Campeonas and the 2022 Barça TV+ miniseries Queens of the Pitch. Putellas is one of the prominent Catalan women, along with teammate Aitana Bonmatí, showcased in the SX3 series Superheroïnes. There have been two series focused on Putellas exclusively, both released in 2022: TV3's La nit d'Alèxia and Amazon Prime Video's Alexia: Labor Omnia Vincit.

Personal life 
In 2012, two weeks before the start of the 2012 UEFA Women's Under-19 Championship, Putellas' father passed away. Her habitual goal celebration is to point her fingers to the sky and look up in dedication to her father. Putellas has a pet dog, a Pomeranian called Nala, who has an Instagram account.

She speaks Catalan and learnt Spanish in school as a child. While Putellas does not discuss her relationships, she has shared social media posts featuring partners: as of 2022 she is dating Olga Rios. She was previously in a relationship with teammate Jennifer Hermoso, with whom she attended Madrid Pride. Putellas also has a large number of tattoos, including various Latin phrases, prominently Labor omnia vincit; a Hand of Fatima; an Eye of Horus; a Barcelona panot tile with "Made in" written above; a football; the number 112 (combining her first Spain shirt number, 12, with her iconic shirt number, 11); and a silhouette of her father holding her as an infant and handing her a football.

Career statistics

Club

International

Scores and results list Spain's and Catalonia's goal tally first, score column indicates score after each Putellas goal.

Honours
Espanyol
Copa de la Reina: 2010

Barcelona
Primera División: 2012–13, 2013–14, 2014–15, 2019–20, 2020–21, 2021–22
UEFA Women's Champions League: 2020–21, runner-up: 2018–19, 2021–22
Copa de la Reina: 2013, 2014, 2017, 2018, 2020, 2021, 2022
Supercopa de España: 2019–20, 2021–22
Copa Catalunya: 2012, 2014, 2015, 2016, 2017, 2018, 2019

Spain
 UEFA Women's Under-17 Championship: 2010, 2011
 Algarve Cup: 2017
 Cyprus Cup: 2018

Individual
Ballon d'Or Féminin: 2021, 2022
The Best FIFA Women's Player: 2021, 2022
Golden Player Woman Award: 2022
UEFA Women's Player of the Year: 2020–21, 2021–22
UEFA Women's Champions League Player of the Season: 2021–22
UEFA Women's Champions League Midfielder of the Season: 2020–21
UEFA Women's Champions League Squad of the Season: 2018–19, 2020–21, 2021–22
IFFHS Women's Player of the Year: 2021, 2022
IFFHS Women's Playmaker of the Year: 2021, 2022
International Sports Press Association – Best Female Athlete of the Year : 2022
World Soccer Women's World Player of the Year: 2021
Globe Soccer Women's Player of the Year: 2021 2022
FIFA FIFPRO Women's World 11: 2022
Trofeo Aldo Rovira: 2020–21
Catalan Women's Player of the Year: 2015, 2017, 2021, 2022
Primera División MVP of the Season: 2019–20
Copa de la Reina Final MVP: 2013, 2014, 2021
Copa de la Reina Top goalscorer: 2020–21, 2021–22
Spain women's national team Player of the Year: 2021
Primera División Team of the Season: 2015–16, 2018–19
GOAL50 Women's Player of the Year: 2021, 2022
The 100 Best Female Footballers In The World #1: 2021, 2022
Fútbol Draft Best XI: 2010, 2012, 2013, 2014, 2015
SheBelieves Cup Tournament MVP: 2020
IFFHS Women's World Team: 2021, 2022
Creu de Sant Jordi: honoured 2021
Gold Medal for Sporting Merit: honoured 2021
International Sports Award Mollet: 2011

See also
 List of women's footballers with 100 or more international caps
 List of recipients of the Creus de Sant Jordi

Notes

References

External links
 
 
 Alexia Putellas at FC Barcelona
 Alexia Putellas at Levante UD 
 Alexia Putellas at BDFutbol
 
 
 
 
 

1994 births
Living people
2015 FIFA Women's World Cup players
2019 FIFA Women's World Cup players
FC Barcelona Femení players
FIFA Century Club
Footballers from Catalonia
Levante UD Femenino players
LGBT association football players
People from Vallès Oriental
Primera División (women) players
RCD Espanyol Femenino players
Spain women's international footballers
Spanish women's footballers
Spain women's youth international footballers
Sportspeople from the Province of Barcelona
Sportswomen from Catalonia
UEFA Women's Euro 2017 players
Women's association football wingers